Backworth railway station served the village of Backworth and nearby hamlet of Holywell in what is now the Borough of North Tyneside, North East England. Located on what is now known as the Northumberland Line, its life as a passenger station was fairly short, it having only been open between 1847 and 1860, but it survived as a goods station until 1965 on the Blyth and Tyne Railway.

History 
The station was opened as Holywell on 1 October 1847 by the Blyth, Seghill and Percy Main Railway on the north side of the level crossing over Church Road, Backworth. From 1860, the passenger station was renamed Backworth, but goods station continued to be referred to using the original name. The was, however, retained as a goods station for many years and, in 1904, was recorded as having handled livestock and general goods. The station was finally closed to all traffic on 7 June 1965, although the line through it remains open.

References

External links 

Disused railway stations in Tyne and Wear
Former North Eastern Railway (UK) stations
Railway stations in Great Britain opened in 1847
Railway stations in Great Britain closed in 1864
1847 establishments in England
1965 disestablishments in England